is a Japanese video game. The video game, was released on 28 September 2000, for the PlayStation. It was developed by Alfa System and published by Sony Computer Entertainment.

A manga adaptation by Hiroyuki Sanadura was serialized in the magazine Dengeki Daioh. The three volumes published by MediaWorks between 2001 and 2003 were translated by ADV Manga between 2004 and 2005.

An anime television series adaptation titled  was animated by J.C.Staff and aired on MBS from 6 February 2003 to 23 April 2003. It is licensed for distribution in the United States by Media Blasters as simply "Gunparade March". A spin-off, was animated by Brain's Base and aired from 5 October 2005 to 29 March 2006. A trilogy of games, the Gunparade Orchestra Trilogy, were released for PlayStation 2 in 2006.

Plot 
In 1945, World War II was abruptly ended when an alien race appeared on Earth and began to slaughter the human population. This alien force, known as the "Phantom Beasts" (or Genjyu in Japanese) had effectively taken over more than half of the Earth. The year is 1999 – 54 years later, mankind is still fighting to survive against the alien forces. Earth forces now use advanced mecha called Humanoid Walking Tanks (HWTs) to combat the invaders, but throughout the ordeal, far too many pilots have been killed in action. To ensure the future of the human race, the Japanese government enforced a student draft which recruited high school students to become HWT pilots. Gunparade March follows the lives of the 5121st Platoon, which consists mainly of drafted high school students and their struggle to defeat the Phantom Beasts and at the same time, lead a normal social life.

Characters 
  
 Atsushi is the main protagonists of the story and an HWT pilot. Hayami is probably one of the most shy and naive characters in Gunparade March. His personality renders him to be dubbed a "goof" among his colleagues and become somewhat an interest for several of the female characters. When he meets Mai, he develops an interest for her and gradually becomes infatuated with her. However, his timidity prevents him from admitting his true feelings and publicly, he considers her as a "good partner on the job". As an HWT pilot, his attributes are quite balanced and this caused him to be teamed with Mai for piloting the two-seater "Tandem" HWT. However, Hayami tends to be nervous during battles and has the habit of messing up. He also seems to be well aware of the concept that the Genjyu feed upon Human's fear and hatred for them which causes them to attack. This is shown when he elaborates a fairy tale (it is speculated that a fairy tale can bring one's childhood innocence back which eliminates most of one's hatred and fear) aloud while carrying Mai to a safe area when they were stranded in a forest full of Genjyu and the Genjyu were rendered motionless. Later on, the whole platoon tried to pair Mai and Hayami up by setting false tasks and trying to trap them into admitting each others true feelings. It initially appeared to be successful until Hayami's naive personality ended the operation in failure. During the New Year's Eve of 2001, Hayami admitted love to Mai and still pilots the Tandem with her.

  
 Mai is the main heroine of the story and an HWT pilot. Mai was a transfer pilot to the 5121st Platoon. She initially separated herself from everyone in the division but formed a friendship with Nonomi and eventually, the whole female crew of the platoon. She first saves Mibuya and Hayami when they were in the effective range of the PBE. Afterwards, she gained the gratitude of Hayami and a slight rivalry with Mibuya. Her skills as an HWT pilot are at near perfection. However, her teamwork is as relatively poor as her communication skills. Later on, Mai reveals that is the daughter of the head of Shibamura Industries. Despite that, she tries to lead a normal life and care for Nonomi, thinking she is responsible for her condition. When Hayami and Mai were stranded, she revealed why she came to join the army despite her status as being the daughter of the head of Shibamura. When she was in her old high school, she became infatuated with an elite HWT pilot but never admitted her feelings to him as he died fighting the Genjyu. Holding a grudge against the Genjyu, she trained to be an elite pilot and was eventually transferred to the 5121st platoon. After Hayami saves her, Mai begins to be infatuated with him but again, she is too shy to admit her true feelings to him.

Adaptations

Manga 
A manga adaptation by Hiroyuki Sanadura was serialized in the magazine Dengeki Daioh. The three volumes published by MediaWorks between 2001 and 2003 were translated by ADV Manga between 2004 and 2005.

Anime

Gunparade March

Episodes

Gunparade Orchestra 
The story focuses and revolves around the 108th Guard Squad, stationed in Aomori, Aomori. A poorly equipped unit with very little military standing, it is often viewed as a 'reject camp' for pilots not making the grade for the elite units based in Hokkaido. The apparent helpless nature of this force is hardly a deterrent for the encroaching enemy armies, ever closing in on both the 108th and the rest of the empire. The young pilots of the 108th, who had dreamed on returning home, are plunged forcefully and unwillingly into a war.

Episodes

Reception
On release, Famitsu magazine scored the game a 31 out of 40. Due to its creativity and attention to detail, it won the prestigious 32nd Seiun Award for Best Dramatic Presentation, beating October Sky, Bicentennial Man, Juvenile, X-Men, and The Iron Giant. and It was a nominee for the "Game of the Year" from Japan Game Awards but lost to Phantasy Star Online (for Dreamcast, GameCube, Xbox and Windows 9x Compatible-PC).

See also
Elemental Gearbolt

References

External links 
 Official game web site (in Japanese)
 Official Gunparade March anime web site (in Japanese)
 

2001 manga
2003 anime television series debuts
2005 anime television series debuts
Alfa System games
Alternate history video games
ASCII Media Works manga
Brain's Base
Dengeki Bunko
Dengeki Comics
Dengeki Daioh
Drama anime and manga
J.C.Staff
Maiden Japan
Manga based on video games
Mecha anime and manga
Media Blasters
PlayStation (console) games
PlayStation Network games
Romance anime and manga
Shōnen manga
Sony Interactive Entertainment franchises
Sony Interactive Entertainment games
TV Asahi original programming
Video games developed in Japan
Video games about parallel universes
Video games set in 1999
Video games set in the 1990s